"Strangers" is the second single by Van She taken from the band's debut album V.

Charts

Track listing

 "Strangers" - 3:36
 "Strangers" (Yuksek Remix) - 4:37
 "Strangers" (Strip Steve Remix) - 6:00
 "Strangers" (Van She Tech Rework) - 3:49

2008 singles
2008 songs
Song recordings produced by Jim Abbiss